Chevalier may refer to:

Honours

Belgium
 a rank in the Belgian Order of the Crown
 a rank in the Belgian Order of Leopold
 a rank in the Belgian Order of Leopold II
 a title in the Belgian nobility

France
 a rank in the French Legion d'honneur
 a rank in the French Ordre des Arts et des Lettres
 a rank in the French Ordre des Palmes Académiques
 a rank in the French Ordre National du Mérite

Other
 Chevalier, a member of certain orders of knighthood
 "Degree of Chevalier", the highest honor for an active member of DeMolay International

Entertainment
 Chevalier (2015 film), a 2015 Greek film
 Chevalier (2022 film)
 Chevalier: Le Chevalier D'Eon, a 2005 anime and manga
 Hotel Chevalier, an American-French short film written and directed by Wes Anderson, 2007
 some characters in the anime and manga series Blood+

Other
 Chevalier de Saint-Georges, Afro-Caribbean and French classical composer, fencer, and violinist
 Chevalier College, an MSC school in Bowral, Australia
 Chevalier-Montrachet, a Grand Cru vineyard in the Côte de Beaune
 Chevalier Family, Roman Catholic congregations founded or inspired by Jules Chevalier
 Chevalier Garden, a public housing estate in Hong Kong

See also
 Chevalier (name)
 Chevallier (disambiguation)